The Fina-Sport was an American automobile manufactured from 1953 until 1954.  The brainchild of Perry Fina, it used a  Cadillac V-8 engine and Hydramatic transmission mounted on a Ford chassis. Styling of both convertibles and hardtops was by Vignale.

References
David Burgess Wise, The New Illustrated Encyclopedia of Automobiles.

Defunct motor vehicle manufacturers of the United States